Madras Fertilizers Limited is an Indian public sector undertaking which is engaged in the manufacture of ammonia, urea and complex fertilizers at Manali, Chennai.

Madras Fertilizers Limited (MFL) was incorporated in December 1966 as a joint venture between Government of India (GOI) and Amoco, with GOI holding 51% of the equity share capital. The company is the first public sector undertaking in the fertilizer industry to get the ISO 9002 certification.

References

Government-owned companies of India
Fertilizer companies of India
Companies based in Chennai
1966 establishments in Madras State
Indian companies established in 1966
Chemical companies established in 1966
Companies listed on the National Stock Exchange of India
Companies listed on the Bombay Stock Exchange